Mitete is a constituency of the National Assembly of Zambia. It covers Mitete District in Western Province.

List of MPs

References 

Constituencies of the National Assembly of Zambia
Constituencies established in 1991
1991 establishments in Zambia